= Kal'a complex =

Kal'a complex is located in Uzbekistan, in the town of Andijan at 40°45'30.3"N 72°22'12.7"E. It was built in 1880–1881 as a military fortress for troops of the Russian Empire. At present the department of manuscripts of works museum of literature and art of Andijan region is functioning here. Complex of national park named after Babur - Bog'i Bobur.

== Architecture and layout ==
The Kal'a complex is situated in the Dukchi Eshan neighbourhood of Andijan, Uzbekistan. According to Uzbekistan's official tourism portal, the fortress originally had walls exceeding 10 metres in height, providing an elevated view over the surrounding city. Its interior contained military barracks, an armoury, a kitchen, an artillery installation and a defensive mound. The fortress was designed to accommodate more than 250 soldiers belonging to two companies of a Turkestan regular battalion of the Imperial Russian Army.
